Medvedev and female Medvedeva (Медве́дева), from Russian medved’ (медве́дь), meaning the animal "bear", are Slavic surnames. Notable bearers of the name include:

Medvedev
(male form):
Alexander Medvedev (born 1955), Russian business manager
Alexander Medvedev (ice hockey) (born 1979), Russian ice hockey player
Aleksei Medvedev (disambiguation) – several people 
Andriy Medvedev (born 1974), Ukrainian tennis player 
Daniil Medvedev (born 1996), Russian tennis player
Danila Medvedev (born 1980), Russian futurologist, business manager 
Dmitry Medvedev  (born 1965), Russian politician, former Prime Minister of the Russian Federation, former President of Russia
Dmitry Medvedev (partisan) (1898–1954), Russian partisan leader in World War II
Evgeny Medvedev (born 1982), Russian ice hockey defenseman
Grigory Medvedev, Soviet sprint canoeist
Hennadiy Medvedyev (born 1975), Ukrainian footballer
Ilya Medvedev (born 1983), Russian Olympic canoer
Maksim Medvedev (born 1989), Azerbaijani footballer
Mikhail Medvedev (1891-1964), Bolshevik, Chekist
Pavel Medvedev (disambiguation) - several people
Roy Medvedev (born 1925), Georgian-born Russian historian
Sergei Medvedev (disambiguation) – several people
Vladimir Medvedev (born 1937), KGB general, senior bodyguard of Brezhnev and Gorbachev
Vladimir Medvedev (footballer) (born 1971), Russian football player
Vitaly Medvedev (disambiguation) – several people
Yukhym Medvedev (1886–1938), first elected chairman of the Soviet parliament in Ukraine
Zhores Medvedev (1925–2018), Georgian-born Russian biologist, historian and activist

Medvedeva
(female form)
Natalia Medvedeva (actress) (1915–2007), Russian actress
Katya Medvedeva (born 1937), Russian naïve painter
Natalia Medvedeva (singer) (1958–2003), Russian singer
Nijolė Medvedeva (born 1960), Olympic long jumper from Lithuania
Svetlana Medvedeva (born 1965), former First Lady of Russia
Yelena Medvedeva (born 1965), Soviet Olympic rower
Natalia Medvedeva (tennis) (born 1971), Ukrainian tennis player
Yevgeniya Medvedeva-Arbuzova (born 1976),  cross country skier
Evgenia Medvedeva (born 1999), Russian figure skater

See also
17000 Medvedev, asteroid
Medvedev–Sponheuer–Karnik scale, earthquake intensity scale

Russian-language surnames
Surnames from nicknames